Pollenia vagabunda is a species of blow fly in the family Polleniidae. It is widespread in Europe and can be found on carrion, although not associated with any specific stages of decomposition. P. vagabunda has also been found in North America, first being discovered there in 1958, with a range from the east coast to British Columbia.

References

Further reading

External links

 

Polleniidae
Articles created by Qbugbot
Insects described in 1826